In atomic, molecular, and optical physics, above-threshold ionization (ATI) is a multi-photon effect where an atom is ionized with more than the energetically required number of photons.  It was first observed in 1979.

Photoelectrons
In the case of ATI the photoelectron peaks should appear at
 
where the integer n represents the minimal number of photons absorbed, and the integer s represents the number of additional photons absorbed.

Structure
It typically has a strong maximum at the minimal number of photons to ionize the system, with successive peaks (known as ATI peaks) separated by the photon energy and thus corresponding to higher numbers of photons being absorbed.

In the non-perturbative regime the bound states are dressed with the electric field, shifting the ionization energy. If the ponderomotive energy of the field is greater than the photon energy , then the first peak disappears.

Features from ultrashort pulses
High intensity ultrashort pulse lasers can create ATI features with 20 or more peaks.  The photoelectron spectrum of electron energies is continuous since actual light sources contain a spread of energies.

References

External links
  Above threshold ionization photoelectron spectra

Atomic
Quantum mechanics